Mikhail Sergeyevich Vorobyev (born 5 January 1997) is a Russian professional ice hockey forward who currently plays for SKA Saint Petersburg of the Kontinental Hockey League (KHL). He was selected 104th overall in the 2015 NHL Entry Draft by the Philadelphia Flyers.

Playing career
Vorobyev made his Kontinental Hockey League (KHL) debut playing with Salavat Yulaev Ufa during the 2015–16 KHL season.

On 27 April 2017 Vorobyev signed a three-year, entry-level contract with Philadelphia Flyers. Following the Flyers training camp prior to the 2017–18 season, Vorobyov was assigned to the Flyers American Hockey League affiliate, the Lehigh Valley Phantoms.

After playing one season with the Phantoms, Vorobyev made the Flyers 2018–19 season opening night roster out of training camp. He made his NHL debut on 4 October 2018, where he earned one assist in a 5–2 win over the Vegas Golden Knights. Vorobyev recorded his first career NHL goal in 5–2 loss to the Colorado Avalanche on 7 October 2018. During the second period Avalanche's goalie, Semyon Varlamov, was crashed into by a teammate, allowing Vorobyev to shoot the puck into the empty net and tie the game 2–2.

Vorobyev played three seasons within the Flyers organization before leaving as an impending restricted free agent to return to his original Russian club, Salavat Yulaev Ufa of the KHL. He agreed to a three-year contract starting in the 2020–21 season on 30 June 2020.

Approaching the 2021–22 season, Vorobyev was traded by Salavat Yulaev to SKA Saint Petersburg in exchange for Dinar Khafizullin on 28 August 2021.

Career statistics

Regular season and playoffs

International

References

External links

1997 births
Living people
Lehigh Valley Phantoms players
Philadelphia Flyers draft picks
Philadelphia Flyers players
Russian ice hockey centres
Salavat Yulaev Ufa players
SKA Saint Petersburg players
Sportspeople from Ufa
Tolpar Ufa players